This is a list of past and present Rangers F.C. players who have been capped by their country whilst at the club.

Fifty-one nations, former and present, have played international matches with teams featuring Rangers players. Rangers have had players take part in matches governed by all continental federations (UEFA, CONCACAF, CONMEBOL, CAF, AFC, and the OFC).

Players in bold are still at the club.



Current national teams

Albania

Algeria

Argentina

Australia

Belgium

Bosnia and Herzegovina

Canada

Chile

Colombia

Croatia

Curaçao

Czech Republic

Denmark

Egypt

England

Finland

France

Gabon

Georgia

Germany

Greece

Honduras

Iceland

Israel

Jamaica

Lithuania

Mali

Malta

Nigeria

Netherlands

Northern Ireland

Norway

Poland

Portugal

Romania

Russia

Scotland

Slovakia

South Africa

Sweden

Switzerland

Trinidad and Tobago

Tunisia

Turkey

Ukraine

United States

Wales

Zambia

Former national teams

Commonwealth of Independent States

Ireland
See Ireland national football team (1882–1950) for details of this national team.

Serbia and Montenegro

Soviet Union

Notes

References

External links
Complete Rangers Scottish Football League Caps

Rangers International
 Internationals
International
Association football player non-biographical articles
Rangers